Loshkaryov or Lashkaryov is a Russian masculine surname, its feminine counterpart is Loshkaryova. It may refer to
Dmitry Loshkaryov (born 1987), Russian association football player
Vadim Lashkaryov (1903–1974), Soviet experimental physicist

Russian-language surnames